Amal Amélia Lakrafi is a French politician of La République En Marche! (LREM) who has been serving as a member of the National Assembly since the 2017 elections, representing the 10th district of French people living abroad, which includes Africa and the Middle East.

Political career
For En Marche!, Lakrafi ran for the 2017 legislative elections and was elected with 71.25% of the vote against Alain Marsaud, outgoing MP for LR in the 10th constituency of the French residents overseas.

In the National Assembly, Lakrafi is a member of the Committee on Foreign Affairs. In addition to her committee assignments, she chairs the France-United Arab Emirates Friendship Group and vice-president of the France-Democratic Republic of the Congo Friendship Group and France-Chad Friendship Group.

In June 2022, Amal Amelia Lakrafi is seeking re-election in the 10th constituency of French nationals living abroad. 140,000 French people live in 49 countries in Africa and the Middle East. Amélia Lakrafi, who again enjoys the confidence of Emmanuel Macron, received the nomination of the party of the presidential majority.

Political positions
In July 2019, Lakrafi voted in favor of the French ratification of the European Union’s Comprehensive Economic and Trade Agreement (CETA) with Canada.

Other activities
 French Development Agency (AFD), Member of the Supervisory Board

References

Living people
La République En Marche! politicians
Deputies of the 15th National Assembly of the French Fifth Republic
Women members of the National Assembly (France)
21st-century French women politicians
1978 births
French people of Moroccan descent
Members of Parliament for French people living outside France
Deputies of the 16th National Assembly of the French Fifth Republic